Carl Spahn (25 February 1863 – 19 February 1943) was a Swiss politician, mayor of Schaffhausen (1895-1917) and President of the Swiss National Council (1912/1913).

External links 
 
 

Members of the National Council (Switzerland)
Presidents of the National Council (Switzerland)
1863 births
1943 deaths